Statistics of Nadeshiko League Cup in the 2016 season.

Overview
Nippon TV Beleza won the championship.

Results

Division 1

Qualifying round

Group A

Group B

Final round

Semifinals
Nippon TV Beleza 4-0 Urawa Reds Ladies
Vegalta Sendai Ladies 0-1 JEF United Chiba Ladies

Final
Nippon TV Beleza 4-0 JEF United Chiba Ladies

Division 2

Qualifying round

Group A

Group B

Final round

Semifinals
Nojima Stella Kanagawa Sagamihara 1-1 (pen 3-5) AS Harima ALBION
Cerezo Osaka Sakai Ladies 2-3 Nippon Sport Science University Fields Yokohama

Final
AS Harima ALBION 2-0 Nippon Sport Science University Fields Yokohama

References

Nadeshiko League Cup
2016 in Japanese women's football